Karol Maleczyński (1897–1968) was a Polish historian.

Karol Maleczyński was born October 28, 1897 in Grębowo near Tarnobrzeg. He was son of Stefan and Józefina. Maleczyński attended to gimnazjum in Stanisławów and Lwów from 1907 to 1915. He enrolled at the University in Lwów, but was enlisted to the Austrian Army. Later he served in the Polish Army. After demobilisation he again enrolled at the University in Lwów, where he study history. He graduated in March 1924.

Maleczyński gained his PhD at the Jan Kazimierz University in Lwów in 1924. He passed his habilitation at the same university in 1929. He became a professor in 1939. After the Second World War Maleczyński was working at the University of Wrocław.

Karol Maleczyński was author of around 250 publications. He was also an editor of the Gesta principum Polonorum.

Footnotes

References

Further reading
Przemysław Wiszewski, Karol Maleczyński (1897-1968), in Mediewiści, ed. Jerzy Strzelczyk, Poznań 2011.

External links 
Biographical entry in the Jagiellonian Library Database

20th-century Polish historians
Polish male non-fiction writers
1897 births
1968 deaths